Gonzales may refer to:

Places
 Gonzales, California, U.S.
 Gonzales, Louisiana, U.S.
 Gonzales, Texas, U.S.
 Gonzales County, Texas

Other uses
 Battle of Gonzales, 1835
 Gonzales (horse) (1977 – after 1996), an American-bred Thoroughbred racehorse
 Gonzales (surname)
 Gonzales v. Raich
 Speedy Gonzales, animated cartoon character in the Warner Brothers Looney Tunes

See also
 
 
 Spanish surname González (surname), also known as Gonzales
 Gonçalves, Portuguese equivalent of Gonzalez (Spanish surname)
 Gonsales, Portuguese variation of Gonzalez (Spanish surname)
 Gonsalves, English language variation of Gonçalves
 Gonzalez (disambiguation)